Orrville  may refer to:

Orrville, Alabama
Orrville, Indiana
Orrville, Ohio

See also 
 Orville (disambiguation)